is a Japanese footballer currently playing as a right-back for JEF United Chiba.

Career statistics

Club
.

Notes

References

2003 births
Living people
Association football people from Saitama Prefecture
Japanese footballers
Association football defenders
JEF United Chiba players